Leandro V. Locsin (August 15, 1928 – November 15, 1994) was a Filipino architect, artist, and interior designer known for his use of concrete, floating volume and simplistic design in his various projects. An avid collector, he was fond of modern painting and Chinese ceramics.  He was proclaimed a National Artist of the Philippines for Architecture in 1990 by the late President Corazon C. Aquino.

Life and career 
Leandro Valencia Locsin was born on August 15, 1928, in Silay, Negros Occidental, a grandson of the first governor of the province. He completed his elementary education at De La Salle College in Manila before returning to Negros due to the Second World War. Locsin then returned to Manila to finish his secondary education in La Salle and studied Pre-Law before shifting to pursue a Bachelor's Degree in Music at the University of Santo Tomas. Although he was a talented pianist, he later shifted to Architecture, one year before graduating.

He married Cecilia Yulo, and one of their two children is also an architect.

An art lover, Locsin frequented the Philippine Art Gallery, where he met the curator, Fernando Zóbel de Ayala y Montojo. The latter recommended Locsin to the Ossorio family that was planning to build a chapel in Negros. When Frederic Ossorio left for the United States, the plans for the chapel were canceled.

In 1955, Fr. John Delaney, S.J., then Catholic Chaplain at the University of the Philippines - Diliman, commissioned Locsin to design a chapel with an open plan and can easily accommodate 1,000 people. The Church of the Holy Sacrifice is the first round chapel in the Philippines to have an altar in the middle, and the first to have a thin shell concrete dome. The floor of the church was designed by Arturo Luz, the stations of the cross by Vicente Manansala and Ang Kiukok, and the cross by Napoleon Abueva, all of whom are now National Artists. Alfredo L. Juinio served as the building's structural engineer. Today, the church is recognized as a National Historical Landmark and a Cultural Treasure by the National Historical Institute and the National Museum, respectively.

On his visit to the United States, Locsin met some of his influences, Paul Rudolph and Eero Saarinen. It was then he realized to use concrete, which was relatively cheap in the Philippines and easy to form, for his buildings.

In 1969, he completed what was to be his most recognizable work, the Theater of Performing Arts (now the Tanghalang Pambansa) of the Cultural Center of the Philippines.  The marble façade of the building is cantilevered 12 meters from the terrace by huge arching columns at the sides of the building, giving it the impression of being afloat. A large lagoon in front of the theatre mirrors the building during daytime, while fountains are illuminated by underwater lights at nighttime. The building houses four theaters, a museum of ethnographic art and other temporary exhibits, galleries, and a library on Philippine art and culture.

In 1974, Locsin designed the Folk Arts Theater, which is one of the largest single-span buildings in the Philippines with a span of 60 meters. It was completed in only 77 days, in time for the 1974 Miss Universe Pageant. Locsin was also commissioned to build the  Philippine International Convention Center, the country's premiere international conference building and now the seat of the Vice Presidency.

After the Federico Ilustre-designed original terminal of Manila International Airport was destroyed by a fire in 1962, the Philippine government chose Locsin for the rehabilitation design. Serving as an international terminal for 10 years, it later became a domestic terminal upon the opening of what is now the present-day Terminal 1, which was also designed by Locsin. A second fire later damaged the rehabilitated domestic terminal in 1985 and the site is currently occupied by the present-day Terminal 2.

Locsin was also commissioned in 1974 to design the Ayala Museum to house the Ayala art collection. It was known for the juxtaposition of huge blocks to facilitate the interior of the exhibition. Locsin was a close friend of the Ayalas. Before taking the board examination, he took his apprenticeship at Ayala and Company (now the Ayala Corporation) and was asked to design the first building on Ayala Avenue, and several of the Ayalas' residences. When the collection of the Ayala Museum was moved to its current location, the original was demolished with Locsin's permission. The current building was dedicated in 2004, and designed by his firm, L.V. Locsin and Partners, led by his son Leandro Y. Locsin, Jr.

Locsin also designed some of the buildings at the UP Los Baños campus. The Dioscoro Umali Hall, the main auditorium, is clearly an example of his distinct architecture, with its large canopy that makes it resemble the main theatre of the Cultural Center of the Philippines (CCP). Most of his work is concentrated in the Freedom Park, with the Student Union Building which was once damaged by a fire, the Carillon, the Continuing Education Center and the auditorium. He also designed the SEARCA Residences, and several structures at the National Arts Center (housing the Philippine High School for the Arts) at Mt. Makiling, Los Baños, Laguna.

Most of Locsin's work has been within the country, but in 1970, he designed the Philippine Pavilion of the World Expo in Osaka, Japan.  His largest single work is the Istana Nurul Iman, the official residence of the Sultan of Brunei. In 1992, he received the Fukuoka Asian Culture Prize from Fukuoka.

Locsin's last work was a church in Malaybalay, Bukidnon. Locsin died early morning on November 15, 1994, at the Makati Medical Center in Makati after suffering a stroke 10 days earlier.<ref>"Did you know", Philippine Daily Inquirer", August 15, 2016.</ref> The campus of De La Salle-Canlubang, built in 2003 on a land donated by his family, was named after him.

 Works 

Churches
 Parish of the Holy Sacrifice, University of the Philippines, Diliman, 1955
 Ozamiz City Cathedral, 1960
 Manila Memorial Park Chapel, Paranaque, 1965 (renovated in 1990, 1995, 2000, 2010 & 2020)
 Doña Corazon L. Montelibano Chapel, University of St. La Salle, Bacolod, 1965
 Church of Saint Andrew, Bel-Air Village, Makati, 1968
 Holy Cross Memorial Chapel, Novaliches, 1969
 Church of the Immaculate Heart of Mary, UP Village, Quezon City, 1970
 Chapel of St. Alphonsus Ligouri, Magallanes Village, Makati, 1970 (destroyed by fire in 2004, now replaced and rebuilt by Arch. Dominic Galicia in 2007.)
 Cadiz Church, Negros Occidental, 1972
 Church of the Monastery of the Transfiguration, Malaybalay, Bukidnon, 1983
 St. John the Baptist Church, Kalibo, Aklan, 1993
 St. Joseph the Worker Parish Church, Bacnotan, La Union, 1994

Public Buildings

Hotels

 Davao Insular Hotel, Davao City, 1960 (now renamed as Waterfront Insular Hotel)
 InterContinental Manila, Ayala Avenue, Makati, 1969 (closed on December 31, 2015 [Hotel site redevelopment is being studied with Locsin's firm L. V. Locsin and Partners according to Ayala Land])
 Hyatt Regency Hotel (now occupied by Midas Hotel & Casino Manila in 2011)
 Mandarin Oriental Manila (closed on September 9, 2014 [Hotel site redevelopment is being studied with Locsin's firm L. V. Locsin and Partners according to Ayala Land])
 Manila Hotel (New Building) 
 Philippine Plaza Hotel, 1976 (now Sofitel Philippine Plaza Hotel)

Commercial Buildings

Sets for Theatrical Production
 Sets for Various Ballets by Ricardo Casell, 1954
 Lady Be Good production by Frederico Elizarde, 1954
 Noche Buena, CCP Dance Co., 1970
 Jewels, CCP Dance Co., 1970
 Madame Butterfly, CCP Dance Co., 1972
 Lucifer, Martha Graham Dance Co., for its 50th Anniversary Celebration, New York, 1975
 Adoration, Martha Graham Dance Co., New York, 1976
 Point of Crossing, Martha Graham Dance Co., New York, 1976
 Larawan ng Pilipino Bilang Artista, CCP, 1989
 La Traviata, CCP, July 1990
 Madame Butterfly, CCP 1994
 Midsummer Night’s Dream, Ballet Philiipines, 1994
 Suite for Lindy, from Ballet Philippines’ Ellias, CCP, 1995

Interior Design

 See also 
 Culture of the Philippines

References

External links
Arkitekturang Filipino - Leandro V. LocsinThe Architecture of Leandro V. Locsin, Nicholas Polites, Weatherhill Books.
Parish of the Holy Sacrifice declared a National Treasure, Francezca C. Kwe. Retrieved on March 31, 2007.
Leandro Locsin. Arkitekturang Filipino. Retrieved on April 18, 2011.Leandro Valencia Locsin. Filipino architect'', Jean-Claude Girard, Birkhäuser Verlag, Basel / Berlin / Boston 2022. ISBN 978-3-03562-092-4.

Modernist architects
 01
Modernist architecture in the Philippines
1928 births
1994 deaths
De La Salle University alumni
National Artists of the Philippines
University of Santo Tomas alumni
People from Silay
20th-century Filipino architects
Visayan people